Tlapalizquixochtzin was an Aztec noblewoman and Queen regnant of the Aztec city of Ecatepec. She was also a Queen consort or Empress of Tenochtitlan.

Family 

She was born as a Princess – daughter of Prince Matlaccoatzin and thus a granddaughter of the King Chimalpilli I and sister of Princess Tlacuilolxochtzin.

Tlapalizquixochtzin married Aztec emperor Moctezuma II (c. 1466 – June 1520). Their daughter was Doña Francisca de Moctezuma.

Her nephew was King Diego de Alvarado Huanitzin.

See also 

List of Tenochtitlan rulers
Teotlalco
Azcasuch
Aztec emperors family tree

References

External links 

Queens of Tenochtitlan
Nahua nobility
Tenochca nobility
Year of birth unknown
1520 deaths
16th-century Mexican people
16th century in the Aztec civilization
16th-century indigenous people of the Americas 
Cihuatlatoque
Tlatoque of Ecatepec
1500s in the Aztec civilization
1510s in the Aztec civilization
16th-century women rulers
Indigenous Mexican women
Nobility of the Americas